The La Hotte bush frog or Baker's robber frog  (Eleutherodactylus bakeri) is a species of frog in the family Eleutherodactylidae endemic to the Massif de la Hotte in southwestern Haiti. Its natural habitat is closed-canopy forest (now largely gone). This arboreal frog hides by day in bromeliads where it also lays the eggs. It is threatened by habitat loss.

References

bakeri
Endemic fauna of Haiti
Amphibians of Haiti
La Hotte bush frog
Taxonomy articles created by Polbot
La Hotte bush frog